is a Japanese company that specializes in games for Java-compatible mobile phones.  The company also licenses content for mobile telecommunications operators, as well as being involved in the original equipment manufacturing of mobile phone games.

History

G-Mode Co., Ltd was founded in July 2000 and merged in March 2014 with ONE-UP Co., Ltd. (a corporation established in 2006) who then renamed itself G-Mode Corporation. G-Mode is headquartered in Tokyo.

G-Mode saw the potential in mobile gaming and managed to obtain the rights to Tetris in Japan in 2001, and currently uses this license to remain a major player in the mobile entertainment industry in Japan.  In 2004, G-Mode acquired the back catalogue of Data East Corporation. In 2005, GungHo Online Entertainment invested in the company. They currently license out these Data East titles on the Wii Virtual Console, Gametap, and Mobile Platform. G-Mode released an official Data East website in December 2007. In 2010 is revealed that the company will publish several Data East titles on the Zeebo console in Brazil and Mexico. On March 1, 2012, after several years of Wii Virtual Console support, G-Mode delisted all of its PC Engine/TurboGrafix-16 games from the service while continuing with the ones originally released on Nintendo consoles.

G-Mode Archives 

In April 2020, G-Mode announced that several old mobile games from the company made in the 2000s will be re-released on Nintendo Switch through the G-MODE Archives label. Following the success of such re-releases, G-Mode announced G-MODE Archives+, which consists of re-releases of third-party mobile games, starting with Detective Ryosuke Akikawa Case Tan Vol.1 "Masked Illusion Murder Case" by Genki. The G-MODE Archives series debuted on Steam in 2021.

Business
G-Mode Co. Ltd. reported earnings results for the fiscal year 2006. For the fiscal year, the company reported consolidated net profit of $440,700 a $1.7 million consolidated recurring profit and a $31.1 million consolidated revenue. The number of subscribers to official websites for NTT DoCoMo handsets rose to 1.48 million at the end of October 2006, up 34% from the end of March 2006, which mainly contributed to the upward revision. The company revised its earnings guidance for the fiscal year 2007. For the period, the company revises consolidated net profit to $594,000 from a previous forecast of a $169,500 consolidated net loss. Consolidated recurring profit was revised up to $2.8 million from $1.7 million. The consolidated sales revenue was revised up as well to $41.1 million from $39.8 million.

Data East games rightsholder
G-Mode owns the rights to more than 100 Data East titles. The following list mostly includes video games mentioned either on G-Mode's original Data East webpage in 2009 or the current version launched in 2017. In some instances, a game can be absent in both of G-Mode's Data East webpages but still be mentioned here if there's a third-party source proving the company's ownership for it (in such cases the reference will be attached next to the title). Although G-Mode published in 2007 a remake of Data East's Super Famicom title Heracles no Eikō III: Kamigami no Chinmoku for mobile phones, this title is not included in the following list because that license is owned by Paon Corporation.

 Act-Fancer: Cybernetick Hyper Weapon
 B-Wings
 Bad Dudes vs. DragonNinja
 Bloody Wolf / Battle Rangers
 Boogie Wings / The Great Rag Time Show
 BreakThru
 Bump 'n' Jump / Burnin' Rubber
 BurgerTime / Hamburger
 Burger Time Deluxe
 Caveman Games / Caveman Ugh-Lympics
 China Town
 Cobra Command / Thunder Storm (1984 laserdisc game)
 Cobra Command (1988 side-scroller)
 Congo's Caper
 Daikaijyu Deburasu
 Dark Lord
 Dark Seal
 Darwin 4078
 Desert Assault / Desert Storm Gulf War / Thunder Zone
 Double Wings 
 Drop Off 
 Dunk Dream 95 / Hoops 96
 Edward Randy
 Express Raider / Western Express
 Fighter's History
 Fighter's History Dynamite / Karnov's Revenge
 Fighter's History: Mizoguchi Kiki Ippatsu!!
 Fire Trap
 Gate of Doom / Dark Seal
 Ghostlop
 Golf Club: Birdie Rush
 Gondomania
 Gun Ball
 Heavy Barrel
 Hippodrome
 Joe & Mac: Caveman Ninja
 Joe & Mac 2: Lost in the Tropics / Joe & Mac 3: Lost in the Tropics
 Joe & Mac Returns
 Kamikaze Cabbie
 Karate Champ
 Last Mission
 Liberation
 Little Magic
 Lock 'n' Chase
 Locked 'N Loaded
 Mad Alien / Mad Rider / Highway Chase
 Magical Drop
 Magical Drop II
 Magical Drop III / Magical Drop Pocket
 Magical Drop F
 Makai Hakkenden Shada
 Manhattan
 Metal Clash
 Midnight Resistance
 Motteke Oh! Dorobou
 Mutant Fighter / Death Brade
 Mysterious Stone
 Night Slashers 
 Nitro Ball
 Outlaws of the Lost Dynasty / Suiko Enbu
 Override
 Peter Pepper's Ice Cream Factory
 Pro Bowling
 Pro Soccer
 Pro Tennis
 Psycho-Nics Oscar
 Ring King  
 Road Blaster / Road Avenger / Turbo Blaster
 Scrum Try
 Shackled
 Shoot Out
 Side Pocket
 Side Pocket 2 / Minnesota Fats: Pool Legend
 Side Pocket 3
 Silent Debuggers
 Sly Spy / Sly Spy: Secret Agent / Secret Agent
 Soccer League - Winner's Cup
 Spinmaster / Miracle Adventure
 SRD: Super Real Darwin
 Street Slam / Dunk Dream / Street Hoop
 Super Birdie Rush
 Super BurgerTime
 Tattoo Assassins
 Treasure Island
 Trio The Punch – Never Forget Me...
 Tumblepop
 Two Crude / Crude Buster (Two Crude Dudes (MD / GEN port))
 Winning Shot 
 Wizard Fire / Dark Seal II
 Wonder Planet
 World Grand-Prix - Pole To Finish
 Zaviga

Not owned by G-Mode
Chelnov (purchased by Paon DP)
Glory of Heracles (Paon DP and Nintendo co-own the copyright. Nintendo solely own the trademark.)
Karnov (purchased by Paon DP)
Metal Max (purchased by Cattle Call, later Kadokawa Games)
Jake Hunter (purchased by WorkJam, later by Arc System Works)
RoboCop and RoboCop 2 (Arcade, NES and DOS versions, purchased by D4 Enterprise)
Rohga: Armor Force (purchased by Paon DP)
Skull Fang (purchased by Paon DP)
Vapor Trail: Hyper Offence Formation (purchased by Paon DP)
Windjammers (purchased by Paon DP)

Notes

References

External links

Data East Revival Project

Video game companies of Japan
Video game companies established in 2000
Japanese companies established in 2000
Mobile game companies
Video game development companies
Marvelous (company)